The Centre for Development and the Environment (SUM) is a research institute which is part of the University of Oslo. Its focus areas are international development and environmental studies.

History
The Centre for Development and the Environment was established in 1990, following the work with the report Our Common Future (the Brundtland Report), presented by the Brundtland Commission chaired by Prime Minister Gro Harlem Brundtland, and the increased focus on the environment and sustainable development.

In 2000, the Program for Research and Documentation for a Sustainable Society (ProSus), formerly called the Project for an Alternative Future (established 1984), was merged into the Centre for Development and the Environment. ProSus was established on the initiative of 17 organisations and was funded by parliament over the Norwegian state budget; it was part of the Norwegian Research Council for Science and the Humanities from the early 1990s and became part of the University of Oslo in 1996. ProSus was discontinued as a separate programme in 2006.

SUM is currently one of the few institutions in Scandinavia advancing synergic, interdisciplinary research on development and the environment, combining insights from the social sciences, natural sciences and humanities.

SUM was also the academic home of the founder of Deep Ecology, professor Arne Næss, and is the organizer of the annual event Arne Næss Symposium.

Structure 
The centre is placed directly under the University Board of the University of Oslo. Its Board comprises representatives from the relevant faculties of the university, that is the faculties of Social Sciences, Arts, Natural Sciences, and Law. In addition, the Board has two members not connected to the university. The current director is Sidsel Roalkvam.

It is funded by the University as well as organizations such as the Research Council of Norway, the European Research Council, the Ministry of Foreign Affairs and NORAD.

More than 50 people are affiliated with the Centre for Development and the Environment. The centre hosts the Arne Næss Programme on Global Justice and the Environment, which includes the Arne Næss Chair, which is awarded each year to "one or several scholars of international standing who have made a significant contribution to the study of global justice and the environment."

SUM is the host institution of Oslo SDG Initiative, the Oslo Academy of Global Governance and the Independent Panel on Global Governance for Health and the geographical research networks the Norwegian Latin American Research Network (NorLARNet) and the Network for Asia Studies.

Education 
Although SUM is primarily a research institution, it offers courses at MA and PhD levels, as well as an international master programme.

Notable researchers
Notable researchers currently or formerly affiliated with the centre include:

Kristin Asdal
Margunn Bjørnholt
Ottar Brox
Harald Bøckman
J. Peter Burgess
Kjetil Fretheim
Jan Fuglestvedt
Nina Margrethe Gornitzka
Beatrice Halsaa
Ketil Fred Hansen
Dag Hareide
Bente Herstad
Fritz Christian Holte
William M. Lafferty
Oluf Langhelle
James Lovelock
Desmond McNeill
Arne Næss
Kit-Fai Næss
Erik S. Reinert
Else Skjønsberg
Nils Christian Stenseth
Kristi Anne Stølen
Nina Witoszek
Sidsel Roalkvam

References

External links
Official Centre for Development and the Environment website—

Environmental research institutes
Research institutes in Norway
Social science institutes
University of Oslo
Environmental organizations established in 1990
1990 establishments in Norway